Who Wants to Be a Superhero? was a superhero genre reality TV series broadcast on the Sci Fi Channel produced by Nash Entertainment and POW! Entertainment. The show was created by Stan Lee and Nash Entertainment. A junior version of the show was broadcast on BBC Two/CBBC in the UK.

Premise
Potential contestants auditioned as their super hero selves. The final 10 selected were then placed in common quarters. The contestants were then tested for super hero traits. Lee was the only judge and would instruct the eliminated contestant: “Turn in your costume”. He also mentored the contestants and made appearances, primarily on TV screens, on a giant plasma at the top of a tower block,  monitor resting in the middle of a pile of trash or on individually issued "communicators". Winner's character concept would be the star of a Stan Lee scripted Dark Horse comic book and of a TV movie for the Sci Fi (SyFy) Channel.

Production
Stan Lee and Bruce Nash developed the concept. In 2004, MTV was considering televising the show even holding the regional auditions. The show moved to the Sci Fi Channel two years later with the pitch well received when they were told that Stan would judge.

The show was renewed for a second season with hints of another country might get a junior version of the show.  Jarrett Crippen, aka the Defuser, won the second season.

US season 1
At the Los Angeles 2004 auditions, Matthew Atherton applied as Knightbeam, powered from artificial light. Atherton reapplied as Feedback and was originally selected as an alternative.

Some filmed challenges were cut from the show. The first challenge (1a) was from Rotiart, a plant from Lee, who talked to the contestants to find out who was there for the right reasons. The next challenge (1b) was to discreetly change into costume and then race to a finish line, with a secret part being to help a lost little girl.

The three finalists had their potential comic book cover shown to them. Then they had the challenge of getting school children to vote for them after telling them their origin story. Fat Momma won the children's vote. The next challenge was to track down Dark Enforcer at Universal CityWalk via planned clues with Major Victory winning. Fat Momma wanted to quit, as she felt Feedback deserved it more, but was convinced to stick it out by the other two. Major Victory was then eliminated.

Feedback won the first season over Fat Momma. The top three, winner Feedback, runners-up Fat Momma and Major Victory, were made into action figures by Shocker Toys released along with the season two's figures. Feedback appeared in the 2007 Sci Fi channel film Mega Snake.

Key:

US season 2
Two or three villains, Dr. Dark and Bee Sting, were used in this season and there was an overarching story line. In addition to the first season rewards of a Stan Lee written comic book published by Dark Horse and a Sci Fi Original movie appearance, the winning character would also get a Shocker Toys action figure.

Jarrett Crippen's character was originally named Take Down, but as that name was trademarked  by a wrestler, Stan Lee chose "The Defuser" after discussing his job as a police detective. Crippen finished filming for his character's movie appearance by January 15, 2009. The movie, Lightning Strikes, also starred Kevin Sorbo.

Key:

A plus sign indicates that the hero was singled out for praise by Lee in that episode.

UK season 1
In the UK version, 13 children competed in superhero persona; it was broadcast on CBBC.

References

External links
Official website
Who Wants to Be a Superhero? UK version at BBC.co.uk
Pictures and profiles of season one contestants at CBS News.com
 
 Page for the Dark Horse comic book
 Review of Who Wants to Be a Superhero? characters on Dark Horse comics page

2000s American reality television series
2006 American television series debuts
2007 American television series endings
American superhero television series
Syfy original programming
Works by Stan Lee